John Batt Jr.  is a local politician and businessman from New Orleans, Louisiana. He is married to wife Andre Batt, and has two daughters, Bailey and Kelly. He is the older brother of actor Bryan Batt.

Batt is a fifth generation, lifelong resident of New Orleans. In his earlier years he attended Isidore Newman School in New Orleans until 1978, and later attended and graduated The Lawrenceville School in New Jersey until he graduated in 1979. Batt attended  Sewanee: The University of the South, transferred and graduated from Tulane University with a BA of English in 1984 and went on to earn an MBA of Finance from University of New Orleans in 1986. While at Tulane, Batt was a member of the Sigma Alpha Epsilon fraternity where he received the Order of the Lion Award.

As a business man, Batt is a franchisee of Jos. A. Bank Clothier since 1992 as well as other businesses, such as real estate and other retail.

Political career
A Republican, Batt served as the only member of his party on the New Orleans City Council, from 2002 to 2006, having represented District A.

District A runs from the Mississippi River to Lake Pontchartrain just below the Jefferson Parish line in New Orleans. It includes some of the most affluent sections of town, and some the most seriously damaged by the Levee failures of 2005 after Hurricane Katrina. The severe breach of the 17th Street Canal in the West End and Lakeview neighborhoods which was responsible for much of the flooding of the city is in District A. The largest section of District A to escape severe flooding was Carrollton.

Batt is currently serving as Deputy Chairman of the Republican State Central Committee as well as Chairman of the Orleans Parish Republican Executive Committee. He was also elected Chairman of the Orleans Parish Board of Supervisors of Elections in 2012 (an organization in which he had been a member since 2008). Other boards and commission seats held by Batt are as follows: Board Member of the Planning and Technical Committee of the New Orleans Planning Commission from 2008-2010, President of the Sugar Bowl Committee from 2013-2014, Crimestoppers Trustee from 2004 to present, Board Member for Beacon of Hope from 2006 to present, and Board Member of the Delgado Foundation from 2006 to present

Sources
 City of New Orleans : https://web.archive.org/web/20051108055806/http://www.cityofno.com/
 Louisiana Secretary of State : https://web.archive.org/web/20060911211304/http://www.sos.louisiana.gov/
 The Automatik : http://www.theautomatik.com/
 Bloomburg Weekly : https://www.bloomberg.com/research/stocks/private/person.asp?personId=253872213&privcapId=253059707

Notes

External links

 Jay Batt's website archived by Wayback Machine
 Earlier version of Jay Batt's website archived by Wayback Machine
 Batt's blogwebsite archived by Wayback Machine 
 "Anybody But Batt" anti-Batt reelection website
 "Batt Sucks" anti-Batt election website archived by Wayback Machine

Year of birth missing (living people)
Louisiana Republicans
New Orleans City Council members
Living people